Brayola is an online lingerie retailer that helps shoppers find better-fitting bras. Its bra analyzer and extractor identify bras based on size, style, color, price, materials, purpose, quality and attributes. The information powers Brayola's engine to match shoppers with more bras that will fit in a similar way.

History
Brayola was founded by Orit Hashay, the serial entrepreneur behind Israel's second most popular wedding services review site, Mit4Mit, and Ramkol, Israel's leading local reviews site. Hashay came up with the idea for Brayola while pregnant to make bra shopping easier for herself and millions of women around the world.

Initially, Brayola developed  to let shoppers crowd-sourced feedback from its online community about whether a bra was a fit or not (faces excluded for privacy). Later on, Brayola leveraged proprietary data to build an algorithm that matched shoppers with bras bought by other women with similar preferences, minimizing the need for returns due to sizing.

In December 2019, Brayola was acquired by Delta for $1.1 million.

The Brayola Boutique
In 2016, Brayola launched the  Brayola Boutique, a marketplace for independent designers.

Funding
Brayola raised $2.5 million in Series A funding from Firstime Venture Capital, Haim Dabah, HDS Capital Venture, and Jonathan Benartzi in February 2016. In 2017, Brayola received an additional $5 million for its Series A round of financing from The Firstime Fund, Ilan Shiloah, Nir Tralovsky, Jonathan Benartzi, Gett (formerly GetTaxi) founders Shahar Waiser and Roi More, and Haim Dabah.

Acknowledgements
Brayola was named on Internet Retailer's Hot 100 list after generating $10 million in sales in 2016, with a return rate of less than 8% and a conversion rate of over 5%.

Hashay has been recognized as one of Forbes’ 10 Female Founders to Watch in Israel and TechCrunch’s Three Israeli Femme-preneurs to Keep an Eye On in 2013. She was also listed as one of Globes Israel’s Top 50 Most Influential Women and top 100 Girls in Tech throughout Europe by Girls in Tech Network in 2012.

Delta Galil Strategically Merges Bare Necessities and Brayola Divisions to Create an Enhanced Women’s Intimates Marketplace

Merger of Bare Necessities and Brayola

References 
https://www.innovationintextiles.com/merger-of-bare-necessities-and-brayola/

Clothing retailers of the United States
Online retailers of the United States
Companies based in New York City
Lingerie retailers